Barai Ghar are a group of mountains in the southeast of Zabul province, Afghanistan -  northeast of Kandahar. It is in proximity to Ata Ghar and Shinkay mountains. Topically, the region was used following the U.S. invasion of Afghanistan as a hiding place by some Taliban insurgents. It has hence seen various gun battles since the end of the war.

Mountains of Afghanistan
Landforms of Zabul Province